Eyewitness is a 1956 British thriller film directed by Muriel Box and starring Donald Sinden, Muriel Pavlow, Belinda Lee, Michael Craig, Nigel Stock and Richard Wattis. It was made by the Rank Organisation.

Plot
After an argument with her husband, Lucy Church storms out of her house and goes to see a film at the local cinema. While coming back from making a phone call, she stumbles across the office where she witnesses the murder of the cinema manager by two criminals Wade and Barney who are in the process of robbing the cinema's safe. When they pursue her, she is struck by a bus and is taken to hospital. Unable to leave the town until they know what has happened to her, the two robbers head to the hospital to observe her. Meanwhile, her husband Jay Church has grown concerned and scours the town searching for her.

At the hospital the medical staff attend to Lucy and place her in a quiet ward although she has yet to regain consciousness. Wade, watching from the nearby shrubbery realises that if she lives she would be able to identify him and he would be hanged for murder and he decides to murder her in spite of the protests of his partner, Barney, who has grown disillusioned with his sinister intent. Wade is uninterested and beats him. He several times tries to enter the hospital to suffocate her but is repeatedly foiled, by the watchfulness of an elderly patient and a series of interruptions by the nurse's boyfriend, an expectant father and the watchman and dog on their rounds.

Eventually, Wade assumes the disguise of a hospital orderly and takes Lucy to the operating theatre where he plans to murder her – only to be prevented by the sudden reappearance of Barney, his associate.

Cast
 Donald Sinden as Wade
 Muriel Pavlow as  Lucy Church
 Belinda Lee as Nurse Penny Marston
 Michael Craig as Jay Church
 Nigel Stock as Barney
 Susan Beaumont as Probationary Nurse
 David Knight as Mike
 Ada Reeve as Mrs Hudson
 Avice Landone as Night sister
 Richard Wattis as Anaesthetist 
 George Woodbridge as Hospital security man
 Gillian Harrison as Molly 
 Nicholas Parsons as House Surgeon
 Leslie Dwyer as  Henry Cannon, expectant father
 Allan Cuthbertson as Detective Inspector
 Thomas Heathcote as Tom, the Barman
 Anna Turner as Mrs. Hays 
 Anthony Oliver as Podge
 Hal Osmond as Hospital Doorman

Production
The lead role of a murderer was a change of pace for actor Donald Sinden, who did extensive research for the part, modelling his performance on Neville Heath. The film was shot in mid 1956. It was one of several "sensible girl" parts Lee played for Rank.

Michael Craig wrote Box's "skills as a director were confined to the ability to say 'Action!' and 'Cut!' She was a very nice lady, a bit like a deputy headmistress, but her main concern while filming seemed to be how the set was dressed."

Critical reception
Variety called it "A neatly made, unpretentious  thriller that should do well for the home market... makes for suspenseful action, although the story is improbable in some of its twists. Pic is well acted and well served by its director and camera crew.

Monthly Film Bulletin thought the theme "was a servicable one; but here the producers have so over-laden the storyline with cosy comic characters as to make wonder if their intention was to deliberately guy their material. Only Nigel Stock and the spirited Ada Reeve emerge with credit and the melodrama is unadventurously developed.."

TV Guide gave the film two out of five stars, noting "a nice little thriller by the Sydney and Muriel Box team" ; while Britmovie wrote, "the minor suspenser has several threads but unfurls with a good sense of timing and provides both excitement and light-hearted moments of humour. Donald Sinden, a rather bland leading man, successfully attempts a very different character role, conveying all the ruthlessness of the cold-blooded killer. There’s also a fine supporting role from Nigel Stock as a deaf safe-breaker."

In his memoirs, Sinden wrote the film "is now shown on television more frequently than any of my other films, but ironically when it first opened, to rather bad press reviews, commercial television was in its infancy and yet to make the impact that was to change the lives of everyone in the country, not the least those in the Rankery."

References

External links
Eyewitness at Letterbox DVD
Eyewitness at BFI
Eyewitness at TCMDB

1956 films
Films directed by Muriel Box
1950s thriller films
British thriller films
Films shot at Pinewood Studios
Films produced by Sydney Box
1950s English-language films
1950s British films
British black-and-white films